Coleophora coenosipennella is a moth of the family Coleophoridae. It is found in the United States, including Pennsylvania.

The larvae feed on the seeds of Stellaria pubera. They create a trivalved, tubular silken case.

References

coenosipennella
Moths described in 1860
Moths of North America